Dark Bar is a 1989 Italian crime drama film directed by Stelio Fiorenza (as Stanley Florency) and starring Marina Suma, Richard Hatch and Barbara Cupisti.

Plot
Italy, late 1980s. In a night club called "Dark Bar", where customers are used to consume drugs, a young girl is found dead. Anne, her sister, decides to find out the murderess. It seems her sister was killed because she was trying to blackmail some important person, and now they are after Anne since they think she knows something too.

Cast

 Marina Suma as Anna
 Richard Hatch as Marco
 Barbara Cupisti as Elisabeth
 Alessandra Stordy as Wilma
 Lea Martino as Enza
 Olivia Cupisti as Lubka
 James Sampson as James		
 Vincent Regina

Release
The film was released in Italy on December 12, 1989

See also
 List of Italian films of 1989

Notes

External links
 

1989 films
Italian crime drama films
1989 crime drama films
Films scored by Carlo Siliotto
1980s Italian films